The 1949–50 Segunda División season was the 19th since its establishment and was played between 3 September 1949 and 30 April 1950.

Overview before the season
32 teams joined the league, including two relegated from the 1948–49 La Liga and 18 promoted from the 1948–49 Tercera División.

Relegated from La Liga
Alcoyano
Sabadell

Promoted from Tercera División

Orensana
Osasuna
Lérida
Plus Ultra
Albacete
Atlético Tetuán
Arosa
Gimnástica Torrelavega
Zaragoza
Salamanca
Elche
Real Córdoba
Numancia
Linense
Mallorca
Lucense
Cartagena
Erandio

Group North

Teams

League table

Results

Top goalscorers

Top goalkeepers

Group South

Teams

League table

Results

Top goalscorers

Top goalkeepers

Promotion playoffs

First round

League table

Results

Second round

Relegation playoffs

External links
BDFútbol

Segunda División seasons
2
Spain